The Ducati Monster 696 is a standard or "naked" motorcycle,  made by Ducati from 2008 through 2014.

Background
Since its launch in 1993, Ducati had sold over 200,000 Monsters, which at one time  amounted to 60% of Ducati's production. The initial Monster was cheap and easy to build and has remained so during its long life.  Ducati's  "less-is-more" rationale of the Monster range aimed to combine high performance in a compact motorcycle. Ducati recently updated the Monster range, with redesigned components to improve performance and appearance. In 2022 Will Burgess repurposed one of these to make a custom Carbon Fibre Monster 696.

Specifications

Engine and drivetrain
The engine is the "Desmodue", a 90° L-twin,   air-cooled engine with desmodromic valve actuation. A slipper clutch prevents locking of the rear wheel through clumsy down-shifting. Although Ducatis often use a dry clutch, this model has a 21-plate oil-bath "wet clutch" which weighs less, gives quieter operation, and needs less maintenance.

Frame and body
The Monster has a steel trellis frame and a lightweight aluminum subframe. The claimed dry weight is (non-ABS).

This is a benefit for inexperienced motorcyclists.

Brakes
The Monster's brake system components including master cylinders and discs are supplied by Brembo. The front has 320 mm floating dual discs and radially mounted 4 piston Brembo p4.32 calipers. The 245 mm rear solid disc have a two-piston p34 caliper. Anti-lock braking system (ABS) is optional.

Notes

External links

 Ducati Monster 696 review Road test of the Ducati Monster 696

Monster 696
Motorcycles introduced in 2008
Standard motorcycles